HDMS Thetis may refer to:

 , a frigate of the Royal Danish Navy
 , a frigate of the Royal Danish Navyy
 , a vessel of the Royal Danish Navy

See also
 Thetis (ship)

References

Royal Danish Navy ship names